Sir Warwick Hele (1568 – 15 January 1626) was an English landowner and  politician who sat in the House of Commons at various times between 1597 and 1625.

Origins
Hele was the eldest son of John Hele (died 1608), a money-lender and MP and was a brother of John Hele (died 1605), also MP for Plympton Erle.

Career
He was a student of Inner Temple in 1581. In 1597 he was elected a Member of Parliament for Plymouth. He was treasurer with Gregory Sprint for maimed soldiers for  Devon  by 1600 and was a J.P. for Devon from about 1601. He was knighted in 1603. 

In 1605, he was elected an MP for Plympton Erle. He succeeded to the large local estates of his father in 1608. In 1614, he was elected MP for Plympton Erle again. He was Sheriff of Devon from 1618 to 1619. In 1621, he was re-elected MP for Plympton Erle and was again elected MP for Plympton Erle in 1625.

Marriage

Hele married firstly Mary Halse, daughter of John Halse of Kenedon and secondly, as her first husband, Margaret Courtenay (d.1628), eldest daughter of Sir William Courtenay (1553–1630), of Powderham in Devon, de jure 3rd Earl of Devon, by his first wife Elizabeth Manners, a daughter of Henry Manners, 2nd Earl of Rutland. Margaret survived him and remarried to Sir John Chudleigh. Her mural monument survives in St Mary Magdalene's Church, Richmond, Surrey, showing kneeling effigies of herself and her second husband 
Sir John Chudleigh.

Death
Hele died on 15 January 1626, around the age of 58.

References

 
 

1568 births
1626 deaths
Members of the Inner Temple
Members of the Parliament of England for Plymouth
High Sheriffs of Devon
Knights Bachelor
English knights
English justices of the peace
English landowners
English MPs 1597–1598
English MPs 1601
English MPs 1604–1611
English MPs 1614
English MPs 1621–1622
English MPs 1625
Warwick
Members of the Parliament of England for Plympton Erle